Brennen College is an educational institution in Kerala, affiliated to the Kannur University. It is located in Dharmadam, Thalassery of Kerala state, India. The college evolved from a school established by the English philanthropist Edward Brennen, master attendant of the Thalassery Port, who had made Thalassery his home. The college was granted special heritage status by the University Grants Commission in 2016 with an aim of conserving college which is more than 125 years old. The college secured 97th position in NIRF all Inidia ranking.

History 
Government Brennen College developed out of the free school established in 1862 by Edward Brennen, a master attendant of Tellicherry Port. It was elevated to the status of a II Grade College with F.A. Classes in 1890 under the University of Madras. The institution became a first-grade College in 1947, and it was shifted to the new building at Darmadam in 1958.

Campus
The Brennen College campus is situated in Dharmadam Panchayath on a hillock just 5 km north of Thalassery town and 1 km away from Kannur-Thalassery National Highway. The campus has  of land housing the academic departments, administrative office, central library, student hostels, staff quarters, and play ground.

Brennen Library 
Brennen college has a Central Library with about 21600 books which contained many vary rare and otherwise not available Malayalam books printed during the nineteenth century mainly at Basel Mission Press, Mangalore. The library has prepared an electronic catalogue of these Malayalam publication in 2004. It is the first electronic catalogue in any Indian language with search mechanism in the local script. The library is a unique source for reference for regional studies.

Departments 
The college has 21 departments:
 Arts
 Arabic 
 Economics
 English
 Hindi
 History
 Islamic History
 Journalism
 Malayalam
 Philosophy
 Political Science
 Psychology
 Sanskrit
 Urdu
 Science
 Botany
 Chemistry
 Mathematics
 Physics
 Statistics
 Zoology
 Commerce
 Physical Education

Notable alumni
 A. K. Gopalan, Communist veteran leader, Ex-Member of Parliament 
 Pinarayi Vijayan, Politician and current Chief Minister of Kerala
 K K Ramachandran Master, Former Minister, Government of Kerala
 K Sudhakaran, KPCC President And MP
 P. Sathidevi, Ex Parliament Member 
 V. Muraleedharan, politician and current Union Minister 
 Akbar Kakkattil, writer
 A. K. Balan, Former Minister of Law Government of Kerala
 A. K. Premajam, politician and parliamentarian
 V. Unnikrishnan Nair, Poet
 A. N. Shamseer, Honorable Speaker, Kerala Legislative Assembly 
 E. Ahamed, Former union minister and longest term served MP in kerala
 James Mathew, Former MLA, politician
 Thayat Sankaran, writer and politician
 K. Thayat, writer
 N. Prabhakaran, writer
 Punathil Kunjabdulla, writer
 Rajan Gurukkal, historian
 Shihabuddin Poythumkadavu, writer
 Vazhakkulangarayil Khalid, former Supreme Court justice and acting Governor of Kashmir
 V. R. Sudheesh, writer
 C. A. Bhavani Devi, sabre fencer

See also 
 Educational Institutions in Thalassery

References

External links 
 Official Website

Arts and Science colleges in Kerala
Colleges affiliated to Kannur University
Universities and colleges in Kannur district
Education in Thalassery
Educational institutions established in 1862
1862 establishments in India
Academic institutions formerly affiliated with the University of Madras